Benagil is a small Portuguese village on the Atlantic coast in the municipality of Lagoa, Algarve, in Portugal.

Up to the late 20th century, the village's economy was based on ocean fishing. Now it is a tourist area with a widely used beach: Praia de Benagil. It's a place where there are few inhabitants but in the summer many people come from abroad.

The population contains at least 60 people but this source is just an average. Benagil village and beach are located close to the internationally famous Marinha Beach.

The beach is not the main tourist attraction in Benagil. That honour is reserved for the Benagil Cave, also known as Algar de Benagil. Out of all sea caves that dot the Algarve coastline between Lagos and Albufeira, the Benagil Cave is the only one that has been eroded both from the side and from the top. This unique natural process has resulted in an opening in the ceiling that allows the sunlight to brighten up the grotto and the beach that it hides.

Algar de Benagil can only be accessed from the water and small tour boats tend to queue at the entrance to pass through this unique sea cave. Passengers are not allowed to disembark. Only visitors who arrive by kayak or SUP are allowed to set foot on the patch of sand inside the cave.

Benagil caves are the most popular of all the maritime caves in Portugal.

See also 
 Caramujeira
https://www.algarveimobiliaria.com/i/viver-algarve/praias-no-algarve/praia-de-benagil/benagil.jpg

References

Seaside resorts in Portugal